Acossus viktor is a species of moth of the family Cossidae. It is found in Russia, in southern Siberia and the southern part of the Tuva Republic.

References

Moths described in 2004
Endemic fauna of Russia
Moths of Asia
Cossinae